Timothy Charles Smith (3 July 196121 July 2020) was an English singer-songwriter, multi-instrumentalist, record producer and music video director. Smith rose to prominence as the frontman of the rock band Cardiacs, which he co-founded with his brother Jim.

Besides the Cardiacs discography, Smith also produced several records including The Sea Nymphs' debut album, his first solo LP Tim Smith's Extra Special OceanLandWorld, and the album Pony with Spratleys Japs.

After having a cardiac arrest and multiple strokes in 2008, Smith was diagnosed with dystonia, putting Cardiacs on an indefinite hiatus. He slowly recovered with help of a JustGiving fundraising campaign, and in 2016 he released the Sea Nymphs' On the Dry Land. In 2018, Smith was honoured with the Doctor of Music degree from the Royal Conservatoire of Scotland, two years before his death in 2020.

Early years: 1961–1977 

Smith was born on 3 July 1961 in Carshalton, Surrey, England. He and his older brother Jim acquired an interest in music around 1972 from their neighbourhood friend Geoff Shelton buying an electric guitar. Jim Smith bought a bass guitar so that he and Geoff could play a blues riff together, while Smith owned a snare drum and would drum with them. The next year, Shelton lent Smith an LP on how to play the guitar, teaching him to play the G chord during a visit. Smith learnt the song "Frankie and Johnny", and played it whilst his mum sang. Around the same time, he heard a section on a record that "[made] his stomach go funny and [gave] him goosebumps". It changed his perception of music, and may have inspired the sound of his compositions. After that, Jim stopped playing bass until 1977.

Some songs written by Smith at around age 13, notably "Interlude" from their debut album and "Billion" from Sing to God, would later be made into Cardiacs tracks. In an interview, Smith commented about his songs written at a young age:

Smith attended Fleetwood Secondary School in Chessington with his friend Colvin Mayers. There, he met Mark Cawthra and Peter Tagg, who would later play in Cardiacs. In 1975, Smith and Cawthra formed an unnamed group with organist David Philpot. They played instrumentals inspired by Egg. The band never played live and Dave Philpot died a few years later. His miniKORG synthesiser was later inherited by Cardiacs.

Cawthra was suspended from school and, after staying at the Kaleidoscope hotel in Kingston, moved to York. During that time, he and Smith would send each other tapes of unkind songs they had written for each other. Smith played in another band at the age of 16 called Gazunder alongside the Sound frontman Adrian Borland and rock drummer Bruce Bizland, which sounded like the rock instrumentals on David Bowie's The Man Who Sold the World (1970).

The Filth to Cardiacs: 1977–2008

Formation, demos and line-up changes: 1977–1984 
At the age of 16, Smith formed a rock group, the Filth. Often misremembered as "Philip Pilf and the Filth", the group was established by Smith in 1977. The same year, the Filth wrote the song "Icky Qualms" and played their first gig the Kaleidoscope hotel, "a hostel for misfits and that". Smith arranged the group with Peter Tagg on drums, Jim on bass, himself on guitar and Michael Pugh on vocals. Mick Pugh, a friend of Jim's, was chosen due to his shouty voice.

In 1979, Smith helped record a 7", "A Bus for a Bus on the Bus", at Elephant Studios in London. 1980 saw Smith recording the first and only Cardiac Arrest album, The Obvious Identity. Eventually, 1000 cassettes were recorded, but only sold at concerts to save on expenditure.

Smith decided to change the name of the band to Cardiacs in 1981. He helped record the band's first album, Toy World, in the same manner as the Cardiac Arrest album – on cassette tape – at a small basement studio known as Crow Studios.  After another line up change, Smith recruited Tim Quy (percussion), Sarah Cutts (saxophone) and Dominic Luckman (drums).

Studio years, side projects and solo work: 1984–2008 

The label Alphabet Business Concern was created in 1984. Smith was asked by vocalist Fish to support his band Marillion on their forthcoming tour near the end of the year.  Smith agreed but was not prepared for the hostile audience that awaited them on all legs of the tour (forcing them off the final three days of the tour). From then until 1999, Cardiacs released six studio albums, as well as a number of singles, EPs and live albums.

During the 1990s, Smith took a break from Cardiacs to work on various other projects. During 1989 and 1991, he wrote songs for a solo album, Tim Smith's Extra Special OceanLandWorld, eventually released in 1995. Smith, his ex-wife Sarah Smith, and William D. Drake were reunited as The Sea Nymphs, a "gentler" version of Cardiacs; they had recorded before in 1984 and released a cassette album, Mr and Mrs Smith and Mr Drake. Smith also performed with Jo Spratley in Spratleys Japs, who released their album Pony in 1999.

In March 2006, Smith toured with Ginger & The Sonic Circus as their support act, performing acoustic versions of Cardiacs' songs, along with his own material. Cardiacs released their only single of the 2000s, "Ditzy Scene", in 2007.

Illness: 2008–2020 
On 25 June 2008, Smith had a heart attack after attending a gig by My Bloody Valentine which caused brain damage through hypoxia and led him to develop the rare neurological condition dystonia.

In 2013, 2015 and 2017, events dubbed The Alphabet Business Convention were held in celebration of and with all proceeds funding Smith and his ongoing recovery. Among other things, they featured live music from bands within the Cardiacs' circle.

In July 2016, a special one-day concert took place in Preston, called The Whole World Window with all the funds going towards helping Smith get better. A cassette and CD album of the same name were also released via Hyena Inc containing performances by the same bands. In January 2018 an appeal was launched on the crowdfunding website JustGiving with the aim of raising £40,000 to fund Smith's ongoing care. The target amount was exceeded in the first day and a new target of £100,000 was set to provide for a year's care.

On 25 October 2018, Smith received the honorary degree of Doctor of Music from the Royal Conservatoire of Scotland. His brother Jim accepted the honour on his behalf.

Death: 21 July 2020 
Smith died on the evening of 21 July 2020 at the age of 59, following another heart attack. His death was announced by his brother and bandmate Jim Smith and bandmate Kavus Torabi. Musicians including Steven Wilson, Mike Patton, Graham Coxon and Dave Rowntree of Blur paid tribute to Smith.

Work as producer and video director 
Smith owned and operated his own recording studio Apollo 8 (at various locations, with the final one being near Salisbury, Wiltshire) and had a long list of production credits to his name.  Since the early 1990s, Smith  produced recordings for a variety of musicians and musical groups, many of whom belong to the so-called "Cardiacs family". These include Levitation, Sidi Bou Said, Eat, The Monsoon Bassoon, Wildhearts frontman Ginger (including his Silver Ginger 5 and Howling Willie Cunt projects), Stars in Battledress, Oceansize, William D. Drake, the Shrubbies, The Scaramanga Six and The Trudy.

Smith created and/or edited pop videos for various bands including Sepultura, Dark Star, Zu and The Frank and Walters, as well as Cardiacs. In 2008, Smith created a film called The Wildhearts Live in the Studio: A Film By Tim Smith, featuring The Wildhearts playing their self-titled album along with surreal interludes.

Discography

Solo
 Tim Smith's Extra Special OceanLandWorld (Alphabet Business Concern, 1995)

With Joanne Spratley
 Pony (All My Eye and Betty Martin Music, 1999)

Filmography

References

External links
 
 
 2016 Sea Nymphs interview with Prog Magazine, Tim's first interview since his accident

1961 births
2020 deaths
English male singers
English male poets
English rock guitarists
English male guitarists
English songwriters
English record producers
English music video directors
Musicians with dystonia
British male songwriters
Cardiacs members
The Sea Nymphs (band) members
People from Carshalton